Hotwired (1994–1999) was the first commercial online magazine, launched on October 27, 1994. Although it was part of the print magazine Wired, Hotwired carried original content.

History
Andrew Anker, Wired's then Vice President and CTO, wrote the original HotWired business plan. On its approval in April 1994, he became HotWired's first CEO, and oversaw the development of the website. Over the next five years several other sites grew out of Hotwired, most notably Wired News, Webmonkey, and the Wired search engine HotBot.

After several previous site iterations, HotWired 4.0 launched on July 1, 1997, marking the magazine's most comprehensive overhaul. The reinvention efforts were led by Executive Producer June Cohen, Executive Editor Cate Corcoran and Senior Designer Sabine Messner. The redesigned site featured Dynamic HTML homepage teasers, more focus on user-centric interaction and a simplified channel structure.

The site launched before the advent of Time Inc.'s Pathfinder.com site, and the emergence of independent web magazines such as Feed, Word, and Salon. HotWired's initial business model was 'corporate sponsorship', which quickly led to the design of the 'ad banner' display areas still in use today. The first banner ad on the internet was an AT&T ad featured on the site in 1994. The first direct marketing focused ads were sold by David Hyman to Virtual Vineyards.  Under the leadership of Rex Briggs, HotWired was the first to measure the effectiveness of online advertising, and among the first to attempt behavioral targeting and the first to apply real-time web analytics, known as “HotStats.”

Wired Ventures' online division was acquired by Lycos, Inc. in October 1998, a year after Condé Nast acquired Wired Magazine. It launched "HotWired 5.0" in September as an aggregator of Wired News and an archive of old HotWired content, slashing fresh editorial content except for Suck and Webmonkey. In 2006, Lycos turned the domain into a pay-per-click advertising hub, seemingly marking the definitive end of Hotwired as an online magazine. However, in July 2006, Condé Nast acquired both Webmonkey and the Hotwired domain from Lycos, and Webmonkey was relaunched in May 2008.

Projects and sites
Projects and sites published under the Hotwired banner from 1994 to 1999 include:

Adrenaline (1994–1996)-Daily Magazine of Alternative Sports developed and edited by Caitlin Pulleyblank.  Magazine linked to an Interactive database of play spots on a graphical interface [realtime surf data, climbing data located (latitude/longitude), ultimate teams, mountain bike trails, rafting locations with posted CFS data].
Animation Express (1998–2002) - Curated collection of animated short films presented in Flash, Shockwave, and QuickTime formats.
Ask Dr. Weil (1996-1997) - Steven Petrow was the founding editor of Dr. Andrew Weil's integrative medicine site.
Beta Lounge (1997–1999) - Live DJ channel
Brain Tennis (1996–1997) - Debate as a spectator's sport
Cocktail (1996–1997) - Recipes for, history of, and variations on cocktails
DaveNet (1995–1996) - Dave Winer's developer musings
Dream Jobs (1995–1998) - Inspiring people & company profiles
Geek of the Week (1997–1998) - Weekly featured member page of HotWired members around the world
HotBot (1996–Present) - Search Engine (partnered with Inktomi)
Intelligent Agent (1995) - Travel through the minds of Rudy Rucker, Randy Shilts, Joshua Quittner, and others.
Member Pages (1997–1998) - Template-based do-it-yourself homepage profiles of users
Muckraker (1995–1996) - Brock N. Meeks follows the Net from Washington, DC.
Netizen (1996–1997) - The first website to cover a presidential election, featuring daily writing from John Heilemann and Jon Katz, edited by David Weir. Where politics, digital culture, and the high-tech industry intersect;
Net Soup (1995–1996) - Listservs and newsgroup postings.
Net Surf (1997) - Events of the Net industry.
Net Surf Central (1995–1996) - An interactive database of the cool Web sites of 1996
Packet (1997–1998) - Intelligence from the technological frontier, featuring Michael Schrage, Brooke Shelby Biggs, Simson Garfinkel, Steve Silberman, and Mark Frauenfelder)
Piazza (1994–1995) - the first communication forum within HotWired, including "Threads" (conferencing system) and "Club Wired" - (a live, Telnet-based chat system customized by Laura La Gassa - hosted by Will Kreth, Susanna Camp, and David Hyman
Pop (1995–1996) - Michael Small oversaw arts coverage (articles, reviews, interviews, streaming audio, chats) featuring editors/writers John Alderman, Rob Levine, Ian Christe, and Sarah Borruso.
Renaissance 2.0 (1994–1995) - HotWired's original art and literary channel, managed by Gary Wolf with illustrations by Sabine Messner
RGB Gallery - Electronic art collection
Signal (1994–1996) - What did e-commerce, e-politics, and e-culture look like in 1995?
Suck (1995–2001) - Web and media commentary redefining the word 'sarcastic'
Synapse (1997–1998) - Colorful, interactive viewpoints on technology and culture, featuring Jon Katz
Talk.com (1996–1998) - Live chats and interviews
Test Patterns (1996) - What HotWired employees did in their spare time
The Rough Guide (1995—1998) - Online travel library in partnership with Rough Guides
Web 101 (1997–1999) - Your smart introduction to the Net.
Webmonkey (1996–2002) - Web programming tips and techniques
World Beat (1994–1995) - Travel

See also
 Wired News

References

External links
 
 Looking back at Hotwired at veen.com (history of interfaces)
 
 
 Kreth, Will. Personal and Corporate Histories and Heresies. Retrieved 19 April 2005.
 Hall, Justin. Justin Hall @ HotWired.  Retrieved 19 April 2005.
 A demo version of the HotWired site from 1995
 

Internet properties established in 1994
Magazines established in 1994
Magazines disestablished in 1999
Internet properties disestablished in 1999
Online magazines published in the United States
Webby Award winners
Defunct magazines published in the United States
1994 establishments in the United States